Alfred Druschel (4 February 1917 – missing in action 1 January 1945) was a German Luftwaffe combat pilot during World War II. He was a recipient of the Knight's Cross of the Iron Cross with Oak Leaves and Swords of Nazi Germany.

Military career
Alfred Druschel joined the Luftwaffe on 1 April 1936. He trained as pilot, observer and then as Luftflotte staff officer. In August 1938, Druschel was posted to Fliegergruppe 20, which, after combination  with Fliegergruppe 40 was renamed II.(Schl)/Lehrgeschwader 2 (LG 2) on 1 November 1938. 

Druschel served with 4.(Schl)/LG 2 during the invasion of Poland and the battle of France, flying the Henschel Hs 123 biplane. During the battle of Britain, he became Staffelkapitän of 4.(Schl)/LG 2 in September 1940, and, flying the Bf 109E, led the unit on fighter-bomber missions against targets in England and shipping in the Channel.

In April 1941, 4.(Schl)/LG 2 operated over southern Yugoslavia and Greece, and from 21 June 1941 the unit took part in the invasion of the Soviet Union. 

When on 13 January 1942 II.(Schl)/LG 2 was renamed to I./Schlachtgeschwader 1 (Schl.G.1), Druschel was promoted to Gruppenkommandeur and in June 1943 to Geschwaderkommodore of Schl.G.1.  Hauptmann Druschel was awarded the Oakleaves in September 1942 for 600 combat missions and the Swords in February 1943 for over 800 combat missions. He operated over the Eastern Front until October 1943. 

On 18 October 1943 I./Sch.G.1 was disbanded and reformed as II./Schlachtgeschwader 77 (II./SG 77). At this moment Druschel left active flying service and was appointed Inspizient der Tag-Schlachtfliegerverbände (supervisor of the day-ground attack air units).

In December 1944 he reentered combat service and was appointed Geschwaderkommodore of Schlachtgeschwader 4 (SG 4) based in the west.

On 1 January 1945, Druschel participated in Unternehmen Bodenplatte, the attack on the Allied airfields in the Netherlands and Belgium. Accompanied by Jagdgeschwader 2 (JG 2), SG 4 commanded by Druschel led an attack on St Trond in Belgium. He became separated from his formation following a heavy flak attack and remains missing to this day in the area south of Aachen.

Alfred Druschel was officially credited with seven aerial victories claimed in over 800 combat missions. He mainly flew ground support missions in Henschel Hs 123, Bf 109E and Fw 190 fighter-bombers.

Kusch was sentenced to death for Wehrkraftzersetzung (sedition and defeatism). Kurt was killed in the sinking of U-154 on 3 July 1944.

Awards
 Wound Badge (1939) in Black
 Front Flying Clasp of the Luftwaffe in Gold with Pennant "800"
 Combined Pilots-Observation Badge
 Ehrenpokal der Luftwaffe
 Iron Cross (1939)
 2nd Class (27 September 1939)
 1st Class (21 May 1940)
 Knight's Cross of the Iron Cross with Oak Leaves and Swords
 Knight's Cross on 21 August 1941 as Oberleutnant and Staffelkapitän of the 2.(Schl)/LG 2
 118th Oak Leaves on 3 September 1942 as Hauptmann and Gruppenkommandeur of I./Schl.G.1
 24th Swords on 19 February 1943 as Hauptmann and Gruppenkommandeur of I./Schl.G.1

See also
List of people who disappeared

Notes

References

Citations

Bibliography

 
 
 
 
 
 
 
 
 
 
 
 

1917 births
1945 deaths
Aerial disappearances of military personnel in action
Luftwaffe personnel killed in World War II
German World War II flying aces
Missing in action of World War II
Missing person cases in Germany
Luftwaffe pilots
People from Wetteraukreis
Recipients of the Knight's Cross of the Iron Cross with Oak Leaves and Swords
Military personnel from Hesse